Association Internationale pour le Développement de l'Apnée (AIDA) (English: International Association for the Development of Apnea) is a worldwide rule- and record-keeping body for competitive breath holding events, also known as freediving. It sets standards for safety, comparability of Official World Record attempts and freedive education. AIDA International is the parent organization for national clubs of the same name.

History 
AIDA was founded November 2, 1992 in Nice, France by Frenchmen Roland Specker, Loïc Leferme and Claude Chapuis, with Specker as its first President.
The AIDA Competitions started to take form in 1993.
National clubs begin to form over all Europe in 1994–1995.
AIDA became AIDA International in 1999.
 In 1999 Sébastien Nagel, of Switzerland, replaced Roland Specker as the President.
 Bill Strömberg, of Sweden, replaced Sébastien Nagel as President in 2005.
 Kimmo Lahtinen, of Finland, replaced Bill Strömberg as President in December 2009.
 Carla Sue Hanson, of USA, replaced Kimmo Lahtinen as President in 2016.
 Alexandru Russu, of Romania, replaced Carla Sue Hanson as President in 2020.

AIDA World Championships 

History of AIDA World Championships:

Team 
 1996: First AIDA Team World Championship in Nice, France, for national teams
 1998: Second AIDA Team World Championship, Sardinia, Italy
 2001: Third AIDA Team World Championship, Ibiza, Spain
 2004: Fourth AIDA Team World Championship, Vancouver, British Columbia, Canada
 2006: Fifth AIDA Team World Championship, Hurghada, Egypt
 2008: Sixth AIDA Team World Championship, Sharm el-Sheikh, Egypt.
 2010: Seventh AIDA Team World Championship, Okinawa, Japan
 2012: Eighth AIDA Team World Championship, Nice, France
 2014: Ninth AIDA Team World Championship, Cagliari, Italy
 2016: Tenth AIDA Team World Championship, Kalamata, Greece

Individual 
 2005: AIDA Individual World Championship, Villefranche-sur-Mer, France
 2007: AIDA Individual World Championship, Sharm el-Sheikh, Egypt
 2009: AIDA Individual World Championship, Dean's Blue Hole, Bahamas.
 2011: AIDA Individual World Championship, Kalamata, Greece
 2013: AIDA Depth World Championship, Kalamata, Greece
 2015: AIDA Depth World Championship, Limassol, Cyprus
 2016: AIDA Pool World Championship, Turku, Finland
 2017: AIDA Depth World Championship, Roatan, Honduras
 2018: AIDA Pool World Championship, Belgrade, Serbia
 2019: AIDA Depth World Championship, Villefranche sur Mer, France
 2021: AIDA Depth World Championship, Limassol, Cyprus

Qualifications and certifications 

AIDA has a star system for grading its freediving certifications:

Freedive certifications
 AIDA 1 Star Freediver, 8m CWT, 1'15" STA, 25m DYN.
 AIDA 2 Star Freediver, 12m CWT, 2' STA, 40m DYN.
 AIDA 3 Star Freediver, 24m CWT, 2'45" STA, 55m DYN.
 AIDA 4 Star Freediver, 32m CWT, 3'30" STA, 70m DYN.

Speciality certifications
 Competition Safety Freediver.
 Competition Freediver.
 Deep Tank Freediver.
 Monofin Freediver.

AIDA has 3 levels of Instructor qualifications and certifications:

Instructor certifications
 AIDA Instructor, can teach up to 3 Star Freediver.
 AIDA Master Instructor, can teach up to 4 Star Freediver.
 AIDA Instructor Trainer, can teach all levels, and instructors.

Records 

AIDA recognized world records as of March 28, 2022.

Pool Disciplines 

The AIDA recognized pool disciplines are static apnea (STA) and three separate dynamic apnea disciplines. Dynamic With Fins which is done with monofins usually but bifins are also allowed, Dynamic With Bifins which uses bifins, and Dynamic Without Fins does not allow fins to be used and divers usually use breast strokes and wall-kicks for propulsions.

Sea Disciplines

See also

References

External links 
 

Underwater sports organizations
Freediving
Underwater diving training organizations
Diver organizations